TEMPI syndrome  is an orphan disease where the patients share five characteristics from which the acronym is derived: telangiectasias, elevated erythropoietin and erythrocytosis, monoclonal gammopathy, perinephric fluid collection, and intrapulmonary shunting.

Signs and symptoms 

The patients were all diagnosed at middle age. The symptoms were slowly and steadily progressive. Telangiectasias developed over the face, trunk and arms. Increased serum erythropoietin levels, eventually exceeding 5000 mU /ml, preceded the intrapulmonary shunting and the development of hypoxemia. Sampling of the perinephric fluid revealed a clear, serous fluid with low levels of protein, few leukocytes and no cholesterol or triglycerides. A monoclonal gammopathy was implicated in all patients tested. Spontaneous venous thromboses occurred in some patients, sometimes accompanied with spontaneous intracranial bleeding in the absence of blood vessels malformations.

Cause
The cause of the syndrome is unknown. The abnormal plasma-cell clone and/or the monoclonal gammopathy are suggested to be triggers of the disease.

Diagnosis
The diagnosis is based on the five characteristics described above.

Treatment 
Complete and partial disappearance of the symptoms of the TEMPI syndrome was reported  with the drugs bortezomib, daratumumab and autologous stem cell transplantation.

History 
In 2010, the case of a man with unexplained erythrocytosis and perinephric fluid collection as main features was described in the Case Records of the Massachusetts General Hospital. As a consequence two strikingly similar cases were identified and a review of the literature revealed three more patients with similar characteristics and a novel multisystem disease, the TEMPI syndrome, was reported.

As of January 2022, a total of 29 patients worldwide with the TEMPI syndrome have been identified.

References

External links 
 Office of Rare Diseases Research (US)
 Orpha.net (EU)
 Hematopia TEMPI Page

Rare syndromes
Syndromes of unknown causes
Syndromes affecting blood
Syndromes affecting the vascular system